Franklin E. Ebner (April 29, 1904 – May 10, 1979) was an American lawyer and businessman.

Ebner was born in Aitkin, Aitkin County, Minnesota. He received his law degree from University of Minnesota Law School in 1929. Ebner lived in Brainerd, Crow Wing County, Minnesota and practiced law in Brainerd. He served in the United States Army. Ebner served in the Minnesota Senate in 1933 and 1934. He also served as the Crow Wing County Attorney. Ebner died at the University of Minnesota Hospitals in Minneapolis, Minnesota.

References

1904 births
1979 deaths
People from Aitkin, Minnesota
People from Brainerd, Minnesota
Military personnel from Minnesota
Minnesota state senators